The Parcel de Manuel Luís Marine State Park is a state park in the state of Maranhão, Brazil.
It protects the Manuel Luis Reefs, an important coral reef of the south Atlantic. The reefs contain the wrecks of many ships.

Location

The Parcel de Manuel Luís Marine State Park is in the Atlantic ocean offshore from the municipality of Cururupu, Maranhão.
The reef is named for the fisherman Manuel Luís, who discovered the rock formation in the late nineteenth century.

History

The coral reefs along  of the northeast coast of Brazil from the south of Bahia to Maranhão are rapidly degrading due to destructive use. 
The state park was considered one of the seven highest priorities for conservation of the reefs.

The Parcel de Manuel Luís Marine State Park was created by decree 11.902 of 11 June 1991 with the purpose of protecting the largest coral reef of South America from the environmental impacts of hydrocarbon pollution and over fishing.
The state park was to protect the marine fauna and flora and natural scenic beauty, under the administration of SEMATUR.
It was to be used for scientific, educational and recreational uses that would avoid changes or environmental impact. The state park became a Ramsar Site in February 2000.

Environment

The reef is an area of great biodiversity, holding all the coral reef species found on the northeast coast.
Coral species include Agaricia agaricites, Agaricia fragilis, Meandrina braziliensis, Great star coral Montastraea cavernosa, Mussismilia hispida, Porites astreoides, Scolymia wellsi, Siderastrea stellata and Millepora alcicornis.
The corals are home to multi-coloured fish such as parrotfish, sergeant major and butterflyfish, and to larger species such as groupers and sea turtles.
Coral bleaching has been reported since 1999.

Shipwrecks

The Parcel de Manuel Luís is in an area of strong currents and variable tides, and for many years was poorly charted.
There are over 200 shipwrecks, second only to the Bermuda Triangle.
Wrecks on the reef include:

1763 São José
1770 Nossa Senhora das Necessidades
1805 Jeune Almirante
1814 Venus
1820 Portuguese frigate
1900 Navio do Cobre
1904 Salinas
1905 Cyril
1921 Uberaba
1946 West Point
1960 Altamar
1962 Ilha Grande
1984 Ana Cristina

The Navio do Cobre, as its name implies, was carrying a cargo of copper. This was recovered by looters.
The Vandyck was an English liner that was carrying 200 passengers from Buenos Aires bound for New York, and was sunk in 1914 by a German ship during World War I (1914–18). 
All the passengers were saved.
The Uberaba was originally the German naval vessel Henny Woerman, captured by the Brazilian Navy during World War I.
The tanker Ana Cristina, the last to sink, is the best preserved.

Notes

Sources

State parks of Brazil
Ramsar sites in Brazil
Protected areas of Maranhão
1991 establishments in Brazil
Coral reefs of Brazil
Protected areas established in 1991